Václav Černý (born 17 October 1997) is a Czech professional footballer who plays as a winger for Dutch Eredivisie club Twente and the  Czech Republic national team.

Club career 
Černý was born in Příbram. He joined the youth ranks of AFC Ajax in January 2013 from FK Příbram. He made his professional debut at Jong Ajax on 13 March 2015 in an Eerste Divisie game against VVV Venlo replacing Robert Murić after 78 minutes in a 1–0 win.

On 15 August 2015, he made his Ajax first team debut in a 3–0 win against Willem II. He scored his first goal on 26 November 2015 in the 2015–16 UEFA Europa League against Celtic, in which Ajax won 2–1. He left the club in 2019 after five seasons at Ajax, during which time he regularly played for their reserve team Jong Ajax in the second-tier Eerste Divisie.

Černý joined Utrecht in July 2019, signing a three-year contract with  Eredivisie side.
Černý spent the 2020–21 season on loan at Twente, before making a permanent transfer in July 2021.

International career
Černý played for his country at youth level from the under-16 level. He was called up to the Czech Republic under-21 team in August 2015, at the age of 17. This call-up drew media attention as he would become the youngest player to represent the team, if he played in the matches against Malta or Latvia in early September. He made his U21 debut on 4 September 2015, starting in the 4–1 win against Malta.

He made his debut for the senior national team on 11 November 2020 in a friendly game against Germany. He started and was substituted at half-time in the 1–0 loss.

Career statistics

Club

International

Honours
Ajax
 Eredivisie: 2018–19
 KNVB Cup: 2018–19
 UEFA Europa League: runners-up 2016–17

Jong Ajax
 Eerste Divisie: 2017–18

Individual
 Czech Talent of the Year: 2015

References

External links
 
International statistics 

1997 births
Living people
Sportspeople from Příbram
Czech footballers
Czech Republic youth international footballers
Czech Republic under-21 international footballers
Czech Republic international footballers
Association football wingers
AFC Ajax players
Jong Ajax players
FC Utrecht players
FC Twente players
Eerste Divisie players
Eredivisie players
Czech expatriate footballers
Expatriate footballers in the Netherlands
Czech expatriate sportspeople in the Netherlands